In computability theory, a Turing reduction from a decision problem  to a decision problem  is an oracle machine which decides problem  given an oracle for  (Rogers 1967, Soare 1987). It can be understood as an algorithm that could be used to solve  if it had available to it a subroutine for solving B. The concept can be analogously applied to function problems.

A Turing reduction in which the oracle machine runs in polynomial time is known as a Cook reduction.

The first formal definition of relative computability, then called relative reducibility, was given by Alan Turing in 1939 in terms of oracle machines. Later in 1943 and 1952 Stephen Kleene defined an equivalent concept in terms of recursive functions. In 1944 Emil Post used the term "Turing reducibility" to refer to the concept.

Definition 

if and only if there is an oracle machine that computes the characteristic function of A when run with oracle B.  In this case, we also say A is B-recursive and B-computable.

If there is an oracle machine that, when run with oracle B,  computes a partial function with domain A, then A is said to be B-recursively enumerable and B-computably enumerable.

The Turing degree of a set  is written .

Given a set , a set  is called Turing hard for  if   for all .

Relation of Turing completeness to computational universality
Turing completeness, as just defined above, corresponds only partially to Turing completeness in the sense of computational universality.  Specifically, a Turing machine is a universal Turing machine if its halting problem (i.e., the set of inputs for which it eventually halts) is many-one complete.  Thus, a necessary but insufficient condition for a machine to be computationally universal, is that the machine's halting problem be Turing-complete for the set  of recursively enumerable sets. Insufficient because it may still be the case that, the language accepted by the machine is not itself recursively enumerable.

Example 

Let  denote the set of input values for which the Turing machine with index e halts. A reduction showing  can be constructed using the fact that . Given a pair , a new index  can be constructed using the smn theorem such that the program coded by  ignores its input and merely simulates the computation of the machine with index e on input n. In particular, the machine with index  either halts on every input or halts on no input. Thus  holds for all e and n. Because the function i is computable, this shows . The reductions presented here are not only Turing reductions but many-one reductions, discussed below.

Properties 

 Every set is Turing equivalent to its complement.
 Every computable set is Turing reducible to every other set.  Because any computable set can be computed with no oracle, it can be computed by an oracle machine that ignores the given oracle.
 The relation  is transitive: if  and  then .  Moreover,  holds for every set A, and thus the relation  is a preorder (it is not a partial order because  and  does not necessarily imply ).
 There are pairs of sets   such that A is not Turing reducible to B and B is not Turing reducible to A.  Thus  is not a total order.
 There are infinite decreasing sequences of sets under . Thus this relation is not well-founded.
 Every set is Turing reducible to its own Turing jump, but the Turing jump of a set is never Turing reducible to the original set.

The use of a reduction 

Stronger reductions 

There are two common ways of producing reductions stronger than Turing reducibility. The first way is to limit the number and manner of oracle queries.  
Such a function can be used to generate a Turing reduction (by computing , querying the oracle, and then interpreting the result).
 A truth table reduction or a weak truth table reduction must present all of its oracle queries at the same time. In a truth table reduction, the reduction also gives a boolean function (a truth table) which, when given the answers to the queries, will produce the final answer of the reduction. In a weak truth table reduction, the reduction uses the oracle answers as a basis for further computation depending on the given answers (but not using the oracle). Equivalently, a weak truth table reduction is one for which the use of the reduction is bounded by a computable function. For this reason, weak truth table reductions are sometimes called "bounded Turing" reductions.

The second way to produce a stronger reducibility notion is to limit the computational resources that the program implementing the Turing reduction may use. The concept of log-space reduction is similar.

These reductions are stronger in the sense that they provide a finer distinction into equivalence classes, and satisfy more restrictive requirements than Turing reductions. Consequently, such reductions are harder to find. There may be no way to build a many-one reduction from one set to another even when a Turing reduction for the same sets exists.

Weaker reductions 

According to the Church–Turing thesis, a Turing reduction is the most general form of an effectively calculable reduction. Nevertheless, weaker reductions are also considered. The notion of relative constructibility is an important reducibility notion in set theory.

See also 
 Karp reduction

Notes

References 

 M. Davis, ed., 1965.  The Undecidable—Basic Papers on Undecidable Propositions, Unsolvable Problems and Computable Functions, Raven, New York. Reprint, Dover, 2004. .
 S. C. Kleene, 1952. Introduction to Metamathematics. Amsterdam: North-Holland.
 S. C. Kleene and E. L. Post, 1954. "The upper semi-lattice of degrees of recursive unsolvability". Annals of Mathematics v. 2 n. 59, 379–407.
 
 A. Turing, 1939. "Systems of logic based on ordinals." Proceedings of the London Mathematics Society, ser. 2 v. 45, pp. 161–228. Reprinted in "The Undecidable", M. Davis ed., 1965.
 H. Rogers, 1967. Theory of recursive functions and effective computability. McGraw-Hill.
 R. Soare, 1987. Recursively enumerable sets and degrees, Springer.

External links 
 NIST Dictionary of Algorithms and Data Structures: Turing reduction
University of Cambridge, Andrew Pitts, Tobias Kohn: Computation Theory
Prof. Jean Gallier’s Homepage

Reduction (complexity)
Alan Turing

he:רדוקציה חישובית